Stockton station may refer to:
 Napton and Stockton railway station, Stockton, Warwickshire, UK
 Stockton – Downtown Station, also known as Robert J. Cabral Station, Stockton, California, U.S.
 Stockton – San Joaquin Street, also known as San Joaquin Street station, Stockton, California, U.S.
 Stockton railway station (County Durham), Stockton-on-Tees, England, UK
 Warthill railway station, Yorkshire, UK; before 1867 called Stockton station